Nadiya Ke Par is a 1948 Indian Bollywood film directed by Kishore Sahu. It stars Dilip Kumar & Kamini Kaushal in lead roles. It was the sixth highest grossing Indian film of 1948.

Cast 
 Dilip Kumar as Kumar Singh
 Kamini Kaushal as Phoolwa
 Hari Shivdasani as Zamindar Pratap Singh
 Kanta Kumari as Mrs. Pratap Singh
 Ramesh Gupta as Sher Singh
 Maya Banerjee as Chanchal Singh
 David as Thakur Gulab Singh
 Ramayan Tiwari as Diwan
 S. L. Puri as Doctor
 Sushil Sahu as Bala
 Samson as Damri
 Gulab as Heeriya
 Juliete as Chameli
 Anant Prabhu as Chonga

Music

References

External links 
 

1948 films
1940s Hindi-language films
Films directed by Kishore Sahu
Films scored by C. Ramchandra
Indian drama films
1948 drama films
Indian black-and-white films
Hindi-language drama films